Gaziantep University is a public university in Gaziantep, Turkey. Gaziantep University has 10 faculties, containing a total of 22 academic departments, with a strong emphasis on scientific and technological research.

Gaziantep is the largest trade and industrial center in the west of Southeastern Turkey. Gaziantep University was founded as a state university on 27 June 1987, but higher education on campus began in 1973 when the institute was an extension campus of the Middle East Technical University. The main campus is located at Gaziantep, which is close to the city centre, with its extension campuses situated in the neighbouring cities.

The objectives of the university are:
 Cultural, scientific, technical, medical and vocational education and training,
 Fundamental and applied research,
 Technical, scientific and cultural exchanges with similar institutions at national and international levels,

The University of Gaziantep enrolled 24,406 undergraduates, 482 postgraduate students, and employed 1,048 faculty members in the 2008/09 school year. The language of instruction at the Gaziantep University is English.

Gaziantep University ranks the thousandth in Times Higher Education World University Rankings from 2020 to 2021.

History and profile
Established in 1973, the Department of Mechanical Engineering and in 1974, the Engineering Faculty of which the medium of instruction is English, are the basis of the university. The Engineering Faculty was founded by the opening of the Department of Electrical and Electronics Engineering in 1974. Following this, in 1977, the Department of Food Engineering; in 1981, the Department of Civil Engineering; in 1982, the Department of Engineering Physics were established.

The university became an independent state university on 27 June 1987. The Engineering Faculty and Vocational School of Higher Education in the body of Middle East Technical University (METU) was connected to the University of Gaziantep by the same law. In addition to them, the Faculty of Medicine, the Faculty of Arts and Sciences, the Faculty of Economic and Administrative Sciences, the Faculty of Education in Adıyaman, Vocational School of Higher Education in Kilis, Graduate Schools of Natural and Applied Sciences, Social Sciences, and Health Sciences and the State Conservatory of Turkish Music were established.

In the body of the university, in 1990, the Vocational School of Higher Education for Health Services attached to the Rectorship, in 1995, the Departments of Industrial Engineering and Textile Engineering attached to the Faculty of Engineering, in 1997, the Higher School of Physical Education and Sports, Gaziantep Higher School of Health, Yusuf Serefoglu Higher School of Health in Kilis, Vocational School of Higher Education in Besni and Vocational School of Higher Education in Nizip, in 1998, the Muallim Rifat Education Faculty in Kilis, and Vocational School of Higher Education in Gölbasi, in 2001, the Vocational School of Higher Education for Tourism and Hotel Management, in 2002, the Education Faculty in Gaziantep and Vocational School of Higher Education in Oguzeli, in 2003, the Faculty of Arts and Sciences in Kilis were founded.

Presently, education is given at eight faculties, three higher schools, a conservatory, eight vocational schools of higher education, three graduate schools and five service departments namely the Department of Physical Education and Sports, the Department of Turkish Language, the Higher School of Foreign Languages, the Department of Informatics and Department of Atatürk's Principles and the History of Turkish Renovation attached to the Rectorship to offer courses in 107 major areas at undergraduate and graduate level.

The university has 624 academic staff, 424 teaching and research assistant, 848 administrative staff, 22,300 undergraduate and 442 graduate students. 22,242 students have graduated.

Faculties
 Faculty of Engineering

Department of Engineering Physics

The Department of Engineering Physics provides professional training on engineering physics and directs students to participate in applied and theoretical research. Undergraduate laboratories provide hands-on experience. The student gains an insight into industrial applications of physics during summer practices performed in the second and third years of the undergraduate program.

Candidates are awarded the degree of Bachelor of Science (B.S.) and/or Master of Science (M.S.) and the degree of Doctor of Philosophy (PhD) in Engineering Physics. Graduate students of the department are employed in many areas such as telecommunications, hospitals, research and development laboratories, power stations, and schools.

In addition to this, there are only five Engineering Physics Departments in Turkish universities, each department focused on different areas. These universities are Istanbul Technical University, Istanbul Medeniyet University, Hacettepe University, Ankara University and Gaziantep University.

Main branches
 Nuclear physics
 Solid-state physics
 Mathematical physics
 General physics
 High-energy nuclear physics
 Particle physics
 Chemical physics
 Optical physics
 Laser physics
 Plasma physics
 Computational physics
 Applied physics
 Astrophysics
 Condensed matter physics
 Atomic and molecular physics

Department of Computer Engineering

Department of Electrical and Electronics Engineering

The purpose of the Department of Electrical and Electronics Engineering is to provide students with a professional education, enabling them to study and participate in applied and practical research studies. Laboratories are equipped for practical courses. The degree of "Bachelor of Science" (BS) is given to the students who have completed the 4-year undergraduate program. The program, established in 1977, gives the student the opportunity to specialize in the area of telecommunications, solid-state electronics, quantum electronics, power systems, microwave and antennas, high voltage and computer science. The department has programs for the degrees of Master of Science (MS) and Doctor of Philosophy (PHD).

Department of Industrial Engineering

Industrial Engineering (IE) is a discipline concerned with the design of production systems, operations management and research (OR), ergonomics, automation, CAD/CAM, quality control, information technology (IT), artificial intelligence (AI) and systems simulation.

IE students take the same foundation courses as other disciplines. They also take some of the basic engineering sciences like engineering drawing, statics, strength etc. They take IE specialty courses in their later years. The IE students take manufacturing courses, which deal with manufacturing processes and other courses closely associated with the manufacturing.

IE has also a "person" section called ergonomics, although elsewhere it is called human factors. Industrial engineers sequence orders, scheduling batches, determine the number of materials handling units, arrange factory layouts and find sequences of motions.

The undergraduate students also take courses in probability and statistics. IE specialty courses that follow these include quality control, simulation, and stochastic processes.

Department of Civil Engineering

The department is furnished with equipment for construction materials, land surveying, structural mechanics, transportation, fluid mechanics, hydraulics, hydrology and water resources to serve the needs of education and research. There are reconstruction materials, structural mechanics, transportation, soil mechanics and hydraulics laboratories, used for instruction, graduate research and for expert service to industry. Students completing their courses are given a 'Bachelor of Science in Civil Engineering' degree. Students do engineering practice at the end of their first, second and third years.

During the fourth year, technical elective courses are offered to enable the students to further their knowledge in specific fields. A graduate program is offered in the fields of construction materials, transportation, hydraulics, structural mechanics, geotechnics and construction management leading to the degree of Master of Science (MSc) in Civil Engineering.

Department of Food Engineering

Food Engineering provides the students with an engineering education directed in manufacture, preservation and distribution of food products. The theoretical and practical aspects of food industry ranging from the quality of raw materials to the final usage of products by consumers are the main concerns of food engineering.

Employment opportunities at the B.S. level include production management, product and process development, process design and project engineering. Food preservation operations and food processing operations are examples of activities that require the skills of food engineering technologists and engineers. The department offers education at both undergraduate and graduate levels (M.S. and PhD). The graduate programme aims to provide more depth and breadth to the undergraduate background of the students.

Department of Mechanical Engineering

Mechanical Engineering ranges from aerospace equipment, automobiles, heavy machinery, through to manufacturing, production and management.  The fields in which mechanical engineers work, cover design, manufacture, research, development, operations, maintenance, education and management. The curriculum is basically the same as that offered by the department when it was affiliated to M.E.T.U. leading to BSc, MSc, and PhD degrees in Mechanical Engineering. Besides the general laboratories, facilities for graduate research and industrial projects are available

Department of Textile Engineering

The Department of Textile Engineering offers courses with laboratory training leading to the degree of Bachelor of Science. Along with the academic training, the students are required to participate in summer practice.

Department of Civil Engineering

The department has been furnished with equipment for construction materials, land surveying, structural mechanics, transportation, fluid mechanics, hydraulics, hydrology and water resources to serve the needs of education and research. There are laboratories for construction materials, structural mechanics, transportation, soil mechanics and hydraulics, used for instruction, graduate research and for expert service to industry. Students successfully completing their courses are entitled to a 'Bachelor of Science in Civil Engineering' degree. Practical experience is a must for this degree and accordingly, students are required to do engineering practice at the end of their first, second and third years. During the fourth year, technical elective courses are offered to enable the students to further their knowledge in specific fields. A graduate program is offered in the fields of construction materials, transportation, hydraulics, structural mechanics, geotechnics and construction management leading to the degree of Master of Science (MSc) in Civil Engineering.

Department of Metallurgy Engineering

 Faculty of Arts and Sciences
 Faculty of Economic and Administrative Sciences
 Faculty of Education 
 Faculty of Medicine
 Faculty of Dentistry
 Faculty of Architecture
 Faculty of Arts and Sciences
 Faculty of Economic and Administrative Sciences
 Faculty of Education

Research opportunities
The University of Gaziantep has been developing computers, ballistics search, inertial guidance in connection with defense research. The University of Gaziantep's educational programs have expanded beyond the physical sciences and engineering into social sciences like economics, linguistics, political science, medical science, dental surgery, architecture and management.

Social issues can be studied in the real-life lab setting of Southeast Anatolia.

Main research areas are the environment, energy (especially in solar and nuclear energy), material, construction, and information/communication technology, ballistics search and social sciences.

This university also known as having most nepotism and favoritism in Turkey, this was surfaced one of the media agencies in 2021, estimating 250 person including academics has less than 10 different family names. No further explanation was offered by the authorities.

Libraries
Gaziantep University libraries have material on physical sciences, medical sciences, engineering resources, social sciences, economics, philosophy, linguistics, political science and management. Some academic departments have their own libraries.

International outreach 
In October 2019 Turkey's official state publication reported that the Gaziantep University would open a Faculty of Islamic sciences in Syria's Azaz, a Faculty of Education in Afrin, and a Faculty of Economics and administrative Sciences in Al-Bab. In Jarabulus it has already opened a vocational school in Jarabulus in October 2018. All educational institutions are within Syria.

See also
 List of colleges and universities
 Gaziantep

References

External links
 University of Gaziantep website 
 Hacettepe University Engineering Physics Department website 
 METU Physics Department website 
 Gaziantep University Engineering Physics Department website 
 Rank of Turkish universities 
 University of Gaziantep Pictures 

Gaziantep
State universities and colleges in Turkey
Buildings and structures in Gaziantep
Educational institutions established in 1987
1987 establishments in Turkey